State Route 576 (SR 576) is a north–south state highway located in northwestern Ohio, a U.S. state.

Route description
The entirety of SR 576 is situated within Williams County. No segment of this state highway is included within the National Highway System, a network of routes determined to be the most important for the economy, mobility and defense of the nation.

History
When it debuted in 1937, SR 576's routing occupied the portion of its existing alignment between its present southern terminus at SR 2 southwest of Bryan and its eastern junction with SR 107 in Montpelier.  At that time, the current stretch of SR 576 between the western SR 107 junction and the eastern US 20 intersection was included as a portion of US 20A, while the stretch between US 20 and the Michigan state line was designated as SR 571.

By 1957, SR 576 took on the shape that it has today, when it was extended northerly out of Montpelier concurrent with US 20A to US 20, then west along US 20 a short distance, and north over the former SR 571 to its present northern terminus at the Michigan state line.  The US 20A concurrency between Montpelier and US 20 was removed from SR 576 by 1964 when the alternate route to US 20 was re-routed to mainline US 20 via SR 15 to the east.

Major intersections

References

External links

576
Transportation in Williams County, Ohio